Tomb KV6 in Egypt's Valley of the Kings is the final resting place of the 20th-Dynasty Pharaoh Ramesses IX. However, the archaeological evidence and the quality of decoration it contains indicates that the tomb was not finished in time for Ramesses's death but was hastily rushed through to completion, many corners being cut, following his demise.

It is located in the central part of the Valley. Its unusually wide entrance stands between, and slightly above, those of two other tombs: KV5 and KV55. Running 105 metres into the hillside, the tomb begins with a gate and a shallow descending ramp followed by three successive stretches of corridor. The first of these has four side chambers – two on each side – but none of these are decorated or finished.

At the end of the corridors come three chambers. The first of these is decorated with the Opening of the mouth ritual, and it is possible that a well shaft would have been dug here had the builders been afforded more time. The second chamber contains four large columns, but neither the cutting nor the decoration work were completed. At the far end of this chamber, a ramp slopes down to the burial chamber, where the pharaoh's sarcophagus was placed (the floor has a rectangular section carved out to accommodate it). The ceiling is vaulted, and is decorated with splendid pictures of the goddess Nut. The side walls show scenes from the Book of Caverns and the Book of the Earth. 

The far wall depicts Ramses on his barque, surrounded by a host of gods. The yellows, dark blues, and blacks used to decorate this chamber are visually striking and unusual among the tomb decorations in the Valley. While the sarcophagus itself has long since vanished, Ramesses IX's mummy was one of those found in the Deir el-Bahri cache (DB320) in 1881.

KV6 has been open since antiquity, as can be seen by the graffiti left on its walls by Roman and Coptic visitors.

Gallery

See also
 Ramesses IX Tomb-plan Ostracon

References

Reeves, N & Wilkinson, R.H. The Complete Valley of the Kings, 1996, Thames and Hudson, London
Siliotti, A. Guide to the Valley of the Kings and to the Theban Necropolises and Temples, 1996, A.A. Gaddis, Cairo

External links

 

Buildings and structures completed in the 12th century BC
Valley of the Kings
Ramesses IX
12th-century BC establishments in Egypt